Samuel Jennings Wilson (July 19, 1828 - August 17, 1883) was a clergyman and academic in Western Pennsylvania.

Biography
Wilson was born in Washington County, Pennsylvania on July 19, 1828 and attended Washington College and was a student and teacher at the Western Theological Seminary (now Pittsburgh Theological Seminary) in Allegheny City, Pennsylvania for over 25 years, serving as chair of sacred and ecclesiastical history. He served as a delegate to various national and world-wide conferences of the Presbyterian Church. He served President Pro Tem. for Washington & Jefferson College from April 20, 1869 to August 4, 1869.  After his death from typhoid in 1883, he was called "one of the abelest and most learned ministers in the Presbyterian Church."

Collected works

References

1828 births
1883 deaths
People from Washington County, Pennsylvania
Presbyterian Church in the United States of America ministers
Presidents of Washington & Jefferson College
Washington & Jefferson College alumni
19th-century Presbyterian ministers
Deaths from typhoid fever
19th-century American clergy